The 1991–92 Yemeni League was the 2nd season of top-flight football in the Yemen.

The season was played from November 1991 till September 1992 and featured 16 clubs, but unlike the previous season, the league winners Al-Ahli (San'a') would not take part in any continental competition.

Champions

Continental Competition

Asian Club Championship

Defending champions Al-Tilal came 2nd and also featured in the 1991-92 Asian Club Championship. They defeated Bahraini league champions West Riffa in the first round before coming up against Iranian Qods League winners Esteghlal whom went on to reach the final.

Asian Cup Winners Cup

Al-Ahli (San'a') entered the 1992 Asian Cup Winners Cup where they were given a bye in the first round before coming up against Al-Nassr of Saudi Arabia in the 2nd round and beaten 2-0 over two games.

References

External links
RSSSF

Yem
Yemeni League seasons
football
football